Fox is an unincorporated community in Carbon County, Montana, United States. It was named for Dr. J.M. Fox, first manager of the Rocky Fork Coal Company and the Rocky Fork & Cooke City Railroad. 

At one time, Fox had two grain elevators and was the largest grain shipping point in Carbon County. Finnish immigrant miners settled here, and as late as 1920 their children still spoke Finnish at home and on the playground, and English only in the classroom. 

Fox was an important stop on the Northern Pacific Railway to Red Lodge. 

Fox has a post office with a ZIP code 59070. It lies on U.S. Route 212, southwest of Roberts and northeast of Red Lodge.

Demographics

References

Unincorporated communities in Carbon County, Montana
Unincorporated communities in Montana
Ghost towns in Montana